Raymond Emil Goedert (born October 15, 1927) is an American prelate of the Roman Catholic Church.  Goedert served as an auxiliary bishop of the Archdiocese of Chicago in Illinois from 1991 to 2003.

Biography

Early years 
Goedert was born on October 15, 1927, in Oak Park, Illinois. He attended St. Giles Elementary School in Oak Park and Archbishop Quigley Preparatory Seminary in Chicago.

Goedert attended Pontifical Gregorian University in Rome, where he obtain a Licentiate of Canon Law.  He also went to University of St. Mary of the Lake Seminary in Mundelein, Illinois, where he was awarded a Licentiate in Sacred Theology.

Priesthood 
On May 1, 1952, Goedert was ordained to the priesthood for the Archdiocese of Chicago by Cardinal Samuel Stritch .Arter his ordination, Goedert served as associate pastor for St. Gabriel and Blessed Sacrament Parishes in Chicago, and Mater Christi Parish in North Riverside, Illinois. He was also a notary, vice officialis, judge of the Tribunal, archdiocesan consultor, vicar for priests, archdiocesan director of NAIM, and pastor of St. Barnabas Parish in Chicago.

Goedert served as vicar general of the archdiocese from 1995 to 2003 and again briefly from August 2004 to November 2004.

Auxiliary Bishop of Chicago 
On July 8, 1991, Pope John Paul II appointed Goedert as auxiliary bishop of the Archdiocese of Chicago and titular bishop of Tamazeni.  He was consecrated by then Archbishop Joseph Bernardin on August 29, 1991.  In 1998, Goedert was one of 75 U.S. Catholic bishops to condemn the U.S. policy on strategic nuclear weapons.

Retirement and legacy 
Goedert sent his letter of retirement as auxiliary bishop of the Archdiocese of Chicago to Pope John Paul II on January 24, 2003.

In 2008. as part of a legal settlement between the Archdiocese of Chicago and sexual abuse victims, Goedert answered questions in a deposition.  Goedert admitted that when he was vicar general of the archdiocese, he knew of sexual abuse allegations against 25 priests.  However, he did not report any of them to police because the standard practice then was to forward the matter to the diocese attorneys.  The attorneys would tell him if a police report was necessary, but they never did.

Goedert served as vicar general under Cardinal Bernardin, and lived with Cardinal Francis George in the archbishop's Mansion during his entire ministry. Goedert was with both men when they died, and gave last rites to Cardinal George.

See also
 

 Catholic Church hierarchy
 Catholic Church in the United States
 Historical list of the Catholic bishops of the United States
 List of Catholic bishops of the United States
 Lists of patriarchs, archbishops, and bishops

References

External links
 Roman Catholic Archdiocese of Chicago

Episcopal succession

1927 births
Living people
Clergy from Chicago
People from Oak Park, Illinois
Roman Catholic Archdiocese of Chicago
20th-century American Roman Catholic titular bishops
21st-century American Roman Catholic titular bishops
Religious leaders from Illinois
Catholics from Illinois